Sapahaqui or Sapa Jaqhi (Aymara) is location in the La Paz Department in Bolivia. It is the seat of the Sapahaqui Municipality, the second municipal section of the José Ramón Loayza Province.

See also 
 Pichaqani

References 

Populated places in La Paz Department (Bolivia)